Diuris laxiflora, commonly called the banded bee orchid or bee orchid is a species of orchid which is endemic to Western Australia. It is a small orchid, common within its range and about half the size of the common donkey orchid, Diuris corymbosa.

Description
Diuris laxiflora is a tuberous, perennial herb with 4 to 6 tufted leaves, each 60–150 mm long and 2–3 mm wide. The flower stem is 300–500 mm long with 1 to 6 flowers. The flowers are 10–13 mm across, are yellow with brown spots and appear from August to October.

Taxonomy and naming
The species was first described by John Lindley in 1839 and published in his "A Sketch of the Vegetation of the Swan River Colony" (1840). In The Genera and Species of Orchidaceous Plants he wrote "The pedicels and ovary together are about 3 inches long, which is less than the length of the internodes. Each stem bears from 4 to 8 flowers, which seem to be dark yellow, with no spotting, but perhaps with some stains of purple."

The specific epithet (laxiflora) is derived from the Latin words laxus meaning 'wide', 'loose' or 'open' and floris, 'flower', referring to the open arrangement of the flowers. The proper word for "flower" in classical and botanical Latin is flos, genitive singular floris.

Distribution and habitat
The species is endemic to the south western corner of Western Australia, occurring in the Avon Wheatbelt, Esperance, Geraldton Sandplains, Jarrah Forest, Mallee, Swan Coastal Plain and Warren biogeographical regions of Western Australia. It grows in sand, lateritic loam, clay and granite rock margins in winter-wet swamps.

References

laxiflora
Endemic orchids of Australia
Orchids of Western Australia
Plants described in 1839
Endemic flora of Western Australia